St James the Apostle's Church, Bonsall is a Grade II* listed parish church in the Church of England in Bonsall, Derbyshire.

History
The church dates from the 13th century. In time it was filled with galleries and the chancel and tower were cut off from the rest of the church by screens of lath and plaster. This was all stripped out during a restoration between 1862 and 1863 by Ewan Christian which cost £1,550. The contractors were Francis and Fox of Cromford. It re-opened on 4 August 1863. A few weeks later it was reported that a new Oak communion table had been provided by Captain Prince, The Study, Bonsall, a stained glass window depicting the Apostles Peter and Paul by Edmundson and Son of Manchester had been given by the Revd. Robert Bickerstaff, Rector of Killead, Antrim, a pair of Glastonbury chairs from Revd. G. Bagot, and carved panels for the pulpit given by Mr. Clay.

Parish status
The church is in a joint parish with
All Saints' Church, Alderwasley
All Saints' Church, Bradbourne
All Saints’ Church, Ballidon
St James’ Church, Brassington
St Margaret's Church, Carsington
All Saints’ Church, Elton
St James’ Church, Idridgehay
Holy Trinity Church, Kirk Ireton
Holy Trinity Church, Middleton-by-Wirksworth
St Mary's Church, Wirksworth

Organ
The organ was installed by Fred Jardine of Manchester in 1867.  A specification of the organ can be found on the National Pipe Organ Register.

Bells
The church tower contains a ring of 6 bells with the tenor dating from 1731, and the 3rd dating from 1656.

See also
Grade II* listed buildings in Derbyshire Dales
Listed buildings in Bonsall, Derbyshire

References

Bonsall
Bonsall
Ewan Christian buildings